Trust the Process II: Undefeated is a mixtape by American rapper Ace Hood. It was released on May 11, 2018, by Hood Nation and Empire Distribution. It features guest appearances from Slim Diesel and Scotty ATL. The production was handled by Foreign Teck, Murda Beatz, Wallis Lane, Kid Class, Chase the Money, Yung Lan, and OZ, among others. The mixtape was released on Ace Hood’s thirtieth birthday. It is a sequel to "Trust the Process", which was released the year prior.

Track listing

References

2018 albums
Ace Hood albums
Albums produced by Murda Beatz